The Open water swimming portion of the 2013 World Aquatics Championships was held between July 20–27 in Barcelona, Spain, in Moll de la Fusta.

Events
The following events were contested by both men and women in Barcelona:

5 km
10 km
25 km

In addition, there was a team competition with male and female competitors.

Schedule

Medal summary

Medal table

Men

Record(*)

Women

Record(*)

Team

Record(*)

References

External links
Official website

 
2013 World Aquatics Championships
2013 in swimming
Open water swimming at the World Aquatics Championships